Hoover City Schools is the public school system serving the city of Hoover, Alabama within the Birmingham, Alabama, metropolitan area. Seventeen schools comprise the 55 square-mile system: 10 elementary schools, three middle schools, one intermediate school and two high schools.  A five-member Board of Education, appointed by the Hoover City Council, acts as the governing body of the school system. Hoover City Schools has more National Board-Certified Teachers than any other system in Alabama; more Alabama Teachers of the Year than any other system in Alabama; and ACT scores above state and national averages. The system has a strong focus on instructional technology and maintains safe, clean facilities.  The system has consistently grown in student population since its inception in the late 1980s.

History

The school system was officially chartered in 1987, breaking away from the Jefferson County School System/Jefferson County Board of Education.  The first school year for Hoover City Schools was 1988–1989. Hoover City Schools started with five elementary schools (Bluff Park, Shades Mountain, Rocky Ridge, Gwin and Green Valley), one middle school (Simmons), and one high school (W.A. Berry).

The first Superintendent of Hoover City Schools was Dr. Robert Mitchell.  He was recruited from Virginia to come to Alabama to help lead the formation of Hoover City Schools.

Schools

High schools 
 Hoover High School
 Spain Park High School

Middle schools 
 Berry Middle School
 R.F. Bumpus Middle School
 Simmons Middle School

Intermediate school 
 Brock's Gap Intermediate School

Elementary schools 
 Bluff Park Elementary School
 Deer Valley Elementary School
 Green Valley Elementary School
 Greystone Elementary School
 Gwin Elementary School
 Riverchase Elementary School
 Rocky Ridge Elementary School
 Shades Mountain Elementary School
 South Shades Crest Elementary School
 Trace Crossings Elementary School

Awards 

Safest School District in Alabama/Niche Rankings
Best School Districts in Alabama/Niche Rankings
Best Places to Teach in Alabama/Niche Rankings
Best Districts for College Readiness/Niche Rankings
Elementary Schools - Best Teachers in Alabama/Niche Rankings
Best Communities for Music Education/NAMM Foundation
Highest Percentage of National Board-Certified Teachers/Alabama
Highest Number of JSU Teacher Hall of Fame Inductees/Alabama
U.S. News & World Report Best High Schools - Hoover High School
Newsweek Best High Schools - Spain Park High School

Athletics 
Hoover High School's teams are known as the Buccaneers, or the Bucs, and Spain Park's are known as the Jaguars, or Jags. MTV's reality series from the mid-2000sTwo-A-Days showcased Hoover High School's nationally ranked football program.  Hoover High has won more than 50 athletic championships since 2000.

Spain Park High School opened in 2001; since then, it has enjoyed multiple athletic championships of its own across several sports.

References

External links
 Hoover City Schools
 Hoover Alabama

Hoover, Alabama
School districts in Alabama
1987 establishments in Alabama
School districts established in 1987